The accession of Kosovo to the European Union (EU) is on the current agenda for future enlargement of the EU. Kosovo is currently recognized by the EU as a potential candidate for accession.

Kosovo's declaration of independence from Serbia was enacted on 17 February 2008 by a vote of members of the Assembly of Kosovo. Independence has not been recognised by Serbia, or five out of 27 EU member states, and as a result the European Union itself refers only to "Kosovo", with an asterisked footnote containing the text agreed to by the Belgrade–Pristina negotiations: "This designation is without prejudice to positions on status, and is in line with UNSCR 1244 and the ICJ Opinion on the Kosovo Declaration of Independence." This has not prevented Kosovo from continuing its EU enacted Stabilisation Tracking Mechanism (STM) programme, aiming to gradually integrate its national policies on legal, economic and social matters with the EU, so that at some point in the future Kosovo could qualify for EU membership.

To ensure stability at the territory and neutral rule of law enforcement, the EU is operating in Kosovo under the umbrella of the United Nations Interim Administration Mission in Kosovo (UNMIK), deploying police and civilian resources under the European Union Rule of Law Mission (EULEX).

The Stabilisation and Association Agreement (SAA) between the EU and Kosovo was signed on 26 February 2016 and went into force on 1 April 2016.

On 6 February 2018, the European Commission published its expansion plan to cover up to six Western Balkan countries: Albania, Bosnia and Herzegovina, Kosovo, Montenegro, North Macedonia, and Serbia. The plan envisages that all six applicants could achieve accession as members of the European Union after 2025.

Kosovo formally submitted an application for membership on 15 December 2022.

Relations and recognition
	 

, 22 of the 27 member states recognise the Republic of Kosovo as an independent state. The EU states that do not recognise Kosovo's independence are Spain, Slovakia, Cyprus, Romania, and Greece. As a result, the European Union itself refers only to "Kosovo", with an asterisked footnote containing the text agreed to by the Belgrade–Pristina negotiations: "This designation is without prejudice to positions on status, and is in line with UNSCR 1244 and the ICJ Opinion on the Kosovo Declaration of Independence."

The European Parliament adopted a resolution on 8 July 2010 calling on all member states to recognise Kosovo. In October 2010, an envoy of the European Parliament suggested that lack of recognition by some countries would not be an obstacle to Kosovo joining the Schengen area's visa-free regime.

All EU member states would need to recognize Kosovo before it could join the EU. Some European officials, including German Foreign Minister Sigmar Gabriel, have said that they expect Serbia to recognize Kosovo before it joins the EU.

Kosovo's foreign relations with EU member states

EU presence

The European Union Rule of Law Mission in Kosovo (EULEX) is based on United Nations Security Council Resolution 1244, which introduced the international rule of Kosovo in 1999. However, the EU force, which was previously planned to be covered by Security council's approval of Ahtisaari proposal, has not received a new UN Security Council mandate due to the opposition from Russia. Russia specifically blocked transfer of UN facility to the EU mission. Serbia also views the mission as an EU recognition of an independent Kosovo.

A 1,800 to 1,900 strong mission was approved by The European Council on 14 December 2007. This was later increased to 2,000 personnel due to an increase in expected instability due to a lack of an agreement with Serbia. It consists of police officers (including four anti-riot units), prosecutors and judges – hence focusing on issues on the rule of law, including democratic standards. The size of the mission means Kosovo is home to the largest number of EU civil servants outside of Brussels. Chief of the mission is French General Xavier Bout de Marnhac, who replaced Yves de Kermabon on 15 October 2010. He is accountable to the European Union member states.

The EU also appoints the International Civilian Representative for Kosovo (also the European Union Special Representative). The level of EU influence in Kosovo has led some to term it an EU protectorate.

On 25 August 2009, the EULEX mission was subject to violent protests, resulting in the damaging of 28 EU vehicles. Three Kosovo police officers were injured in the clashes which resulted in 21 arrests by the Kosovo police. The attack was organised by a group called "Vetëvendosje!" ("Self-Determination") in reaction to EULEX's police cooperation with Serbia and its actions in Kosovo. There is resentment towards the EU mission for exercising its powers over Kosovo while mediating between the state and Serbia. Policies concentrating on crisis management, rather than resolution, as well as the pursuit of ethnic autonomy and its overly broad mandate over Kosovo's governance is at the stem of the discontent with the EU mission.

Stabilisation Tracking Mechanism
A Stabilisation Tracking Mechanism (STM), established for Kosovo on 6 November 2002, is an association process specially devised to promote policy dialogue between the EU and the Kosovan authorities on EU approximation matters, since it was not able to commence with the Stabilisation and Association Process due to its disputed status. In addition, in March 2007, a new structure of sectoral meetings under the umbrella of the STM was established in the areas of: good governance, economy, internal market, innovation and infrastructure.

Potential candidacy
The EU is divided on their policy towards Kosovo, with 5 of 27 EU member states (Cyprus, Greece, Romania, Slovakia, Spain) not recognising its sovereignty. Kosovo is officially considered a potential candidate for membership by the European Union, and it has been given a clear "European perspective" by the Council of the European Union. As confirmed by the Thessaloniki Summit in June 2003, Kosovo is firmly anchored in the framework of the Stabilisation and Association Process (SAP), the EU policy which applies to the Western Balkans which is designed to prepare potential candidates for membership.

On 20 April 2005 the European Commission adopted the Communication on Kosovo to the Council "A European Future for Kosovo" which reinforced the Commission's commitment to Kosovo. On 20 January 2006, the Council adopted a European Partnership for Serbia and Montenegro including Kosovo as defined by UNSCR1244. The European Partnership is a means to materialise the European perspective of the Western Balkan countries within the framework of the SAP. The Provisional Institutions of Self-Government (PISG) adopted an Action Plan for the Implementation of the European Partnership in August 2006 and this document formed the current working basis between the EU and the PISG. The PISG regularly reported on the implementation of this action plan.

Kosovo's declaration of independence from Serbia was enacted on 17 February 2008 by a vote of members of the Assembly of Kosovo. The fact that the declaration was not recognised by Serbia and several EU member states did not prevent Kosovo from continuing its STM programme, which aimed to gradually integrate its national policies on legal, economic and social matters with EU so that at some point in the future they would qualify for EU membership. , fifteen meetings of the STM have taken place. In addition, in March 2007 a new structure of sectoral meetings under the umbrella of the STM was established in the areas of: good governance, economy, internal market, innovation and infrastructure.

In October 2009, the European Commission noted in its annual report on the progress of the candidates and potential candidates for EU accession that Kosovo faced major challenges including ensuring the rule of law, the fight against corruption and organised crime, the strengthening of administrative capacity, and the protection of the Serb and other minorities.

Negotiations for EU membership would only start after Kosovo submits an application and is made an official candidate for membership. Enver Hoxhaj, Kosovo's Minister of Foreign Affairs, has suggested that the EU should enlarge to Serbia and Kosovo simultaneously due to concerns that if Serbia was admitted first they could veto Kosovo's membership.

In May 2014, Hoxhaj said that Kosovo's goal was for EU membership within a decade.
In May 2018, Bulgaria – holding the rotating presidency of the Council of the European Union – hosted a summit on the Western Balkans, which aimed to facilitate accession by the six, including enhanced regional security cooperation and regional connectivity. It was noteworthy that the Summit referred to 'partners' rather than states: this reflects the issue that Kosovo is only partially recognised as a state. The European Commission is sensitive to the issue which was addressed in a speech by the EU's High Representative/Vice-President Federica Mogherini at the European Parliament Plenary Session on the Western Balkan Strategy: " shared, unequivocal, concrete perspective for European Union integration for each and every one of the six partners. Each at its own pace, with its own specificities and under different conditions, but the direction is clear and is one ".

On 3 March 2022 a resolution was passed by Kosovo's Parliament requesting that the government "take all necessary steps to join NATO, European Union, Council of Europe and other international organizations". In June 2022, Prime Minister of Kosovo Albin Kurti stated that he planned to formally submit an application for membership by the end of the year. On 15 December 2022, Kosovo formally submitted an application for European Union membership.

Stabilisation and Association Agreement
Prior to applying for full membership in the EU, Kosovo sought to sign a Stabilisation and Association Agreement (SAA) with the EU, which according to the European Parliament "defines rights and obligations of both parties until the EU membership." A feasibility study on the prospects for a SAA with Kosovo was launched by the European Commission in March 2012. On 10 October 2012 the results were published.  It found that there were no legal obstacles to this, as full sovereignty is not required for such an agreement, and recommended that negotiations start as soon as Kosovo had made further progress in the four areas: Rule of law, Public administration, Protection of minorities, and Trade.

2013 Brussels Agreement
On 19 April 2013, the governments of Kosovo and Serbia completed an agreement that was hailed as a major step towards normalising relations, and would allow both Serbia and Kosovo to advance in European integration. The agreement is reported to commit both states not to "block, or encourage others to block, the other side's progress in the respective EU paths." Though it does not amount to a recognition of Kosovo's independence by Belgrade, EU High Representative for Foreign Affairs and Security Policy Catherine Ashton was quoted as saying, "What we are seeing is a step away from the past and, for both of them, a step closer to Europe", whilst Thaçi declared "This agreement will help us heal the wounds of the past if we have the wisdom and the knowledge to implement it in practice." The accord was ratified by the Kosovo assembly on 28 June 2013.

Several days after the agreement was reached, the European Commission recommended authorising the launch of negotiations on a SAA between the EU and Kosovo, as well as starting EU membership negotiations with Serbia. On 28 June 2013, the European Council endorsed the Council of the European Union's conclusions on negotiations with both Kosovo and Serbia.

Negotiations were formally launched on 28 October 2013, and were completed on 2 May 2014. The agreement was initialled on 25 July 2014 and the treaty was signed on 27 October 2015.

It was the first SAA signed after the entry into force of the Lisbon treaty, which conferred legal personality to the EU. As a result, an EU representative in Kosovo explained that "unlike SAA with other countries of the region, this one will be exclusively the EU agreement. The EU will co-sign it as a legal entity." The agreement did not need to be individually ratified by each member state. The representative went on to say that "since Kosovo is not recognised by the five member states, we had to issue a directive saying that the signing of the agreement will not signify that the EU or any of the countries recognise Kosovo as a state." The SAA entered into force on 1 April 2016.

State of Stabilisation and Association Agreement ratification

Unilateral euro adoption

Before Kosovo declared independence in 2008, Kosovo's economy had undergone a currency substitution, with the Deutsche Mark being the most used currency. As a result, like Germany, Kosovo (which was then a United Nations mandate) switched to the euro on 1 January 2002. The change to the euro was achieved in cooperation with the European Central Bank, and several national banks in the Eurozone. Kosovo does not mint any coins of its own.

It is unclear how Kosovo's unilateral use of the euro will impact its aspirations for further integration into the EU, which requires that states meet several convergence criteria prior to being allowed to join the eurozone.  Montenegro, like Kosovo, has also unilaterally adopted the euro and is currently conducting membership negotiations with the EU.  Since Montenegro's application for membership, the European Commission and the ECB have voiced their discontent over its use of the euro on several occasions. A statement attached to Montenegro's Stabilisation and Association Agreement with the EU read: "unilateral introduction of the euro was not compatible with the Treaty." The issue is expected to be resolved through the negotiations process. The ECB has stated that the implications of unilateral euro adoption "would be spelled out at the latest in the event of possible negotiations on EU accession." Diplomats have suggested that it is unlikely Montenegro will be forced to withdraw the euro from circulation in their country.

Visa liberalisation

Kosovo is the only potential candidate for membership in the Balkans that does not have visa free access for the Schengen Area. The EU and Kosovo launched a visa liberalisation dialogue on 19 January 2012. On 14 June 2012, Kosovo received a roadmap for visa liberalisation with the EU, detailing the necessary reforms.  
The European Commission formally proposed Kosovo be granted visa free travel in May 2016. The EU stipulated that the approval visa free access for citizens of Kosovo to the Schengen area is conditional on Kosovo approving a border demarcation agreement with Montenegro. The border agreement was approved by Kosovo's parliament in March 2018. A Commission report from July 2018 concluded that Kosovo had met all of the conditions required of it for visa free access to the Schengen area.  However, the approval of all EU member states is required to lift existing visa requirements, and several states have blocked the move.

In 2021, the EU Parliament urged the EU Council to implement the visa liberalisation for nationals of Kosovo, after an EU report concluded that Kosovo had met all of the conditions required for visa liberalisation. In November 2022, the EU Council proposed implementing the visa liberalisation on 1 December 2023 at the latest, or at the same as ETIAS if earlier. On 14 December 2022, the EU Council presidency and representatives of the European Parliament agreed to implement visa liberalisation by 1 January 2024 subject to formal approval by the Council and European Parliament. The plans were formally approved by the Council of the EU on 9 March 2023.

Public opinion 
The opinion of the kosovo people is majority favorable towards the EU and US.

Chronology of relations with the EU

Negotiation progress 
Negotiation talks have not yet started.

See also

Enlargement of the European Union 
Accession of Serbia to the European Union
Political status of Kosovo
United Nations Security Council Resolution 1244
Yugoslavia and the European Economic Community
Accession of Montenegro to the European Union

References

External links
European Commission Enlargement: Kosovo – EU Kosovo relations
Commission of the European Communities: Kosovo (under UNSCR 1244/99) 2008 Progress Report
EU Integration Office – Kosovo Government: Kosovo – EU Integration Office

Kosovo
 
Politics of Kosovo